Hillbank is a residential suburb of the City of Playford in the northern suburbs of Adelaide, South Australia. It contains such features as Jo Gapper Regional Park, Hillbank Childcare Centre, Elizabeth Pistol Club and an On The Run petrol station.

History
The original subdivision was laid out under the name of Hill Bank. The name was changed to Hillbank in 1966. Further land including the former suburb of Elizabeth Heights was added to Hillbank in 1987. Hillbank was home to the local "Drive In" theatre which opened on 16 May 1958 and closed in the late 1980s and was later pulled down and made into Burchwood Estate. Hillbank has a local shopping area (a bottle’o) on Bogan Road.

Jo Gapper Park
Jo Gapper Park is a recreation reserve in Hillbank, on the face of the Adelaide Hills with views across the plains. It has a lookout with views across  and Parafield Airport.

Demographics
The 2016 Census by the Australian Bureau of Statistics counted 4,610 persons in the suburb of Hillbank on census night. Of these, 2,315 (50.2%) were male and 2,300 (49.8%) were female.
The majority of residents 3,303 (72.0%) was born in Australia. 545 (11.9%) were born in England.
The median age of Hillbank residents is 38.  Children aged 0–14 years made up 18.5% of the population and people aged 65 years and over made up 12.0% of the population.

References

Suburbs of Adelaide